Barbara Alberti (born April 11, 1943) is an Italian writer, journalist and screenwriter.

Early life 
Alberti was born in Umbertide and grew up in a poor family; she was given a Catholic education. When she was 15, her family moved to Rome.  Alberti has said that, although she hated the city at first sight, she eventually warmed to it. She attended Rome University and took a degree in philosophy.

Work
She aims to fight the traditional feminine image. Her works include the picaresque evil Memorie Malvagie (1976) to the meditative Vangelo secondo Maria (1979), a stronger work tinged with humor and provocation such as Il signore è servito (1983), Povera bambina (1988), Parliamo d'amore (1989), Delirio e Gianna Nannini from Siena, both from 1991, and Il promesso sposo (1994), a profile dedicated to the art critic Vittorio Sgarbi and presented in the guise of a "fake" autobiography.

A humorous production is La donna è un animale stravagante davvero: ottanta ritratti ingiusti e capricciosi (1998), in which Alberti imaginged Don Giovanni beside some female figures of her generation. Her protagonists take on the same challenge: to find the happiness. Creatures in revolt: injudicious old, children of hell, hell, saints. She has been passionate about the fantastic biographies of existing characters, living and dead.

In 2003, Alberti published Gelosa di Majakovsky, a biography of the poet (for which, in the same year, she was awarded the Alghero Woman Prize), and The Prince's Steering Wheel, in which she told the life of Antoine de Saint-Exupéry. In 2006 she authored a book of short stories about husbands returning home.

She is the author of many screenplays, including Anche gli angeli mangiano fagioli (1973), Il portiere di notte (1974) and Melissa P. (2005), as well as plays Ecce Homo.

Since 2009, she has written a weekly column, "La posta di Barbara Alberti" in Il Fatto Quotidiano.

Alberti worked as commentator/pundit on television talk shows, including Pomeriggio 5, Italia sul 2 and La guardiana del faro.

Personal life
Alberti married producer and screenwriter Amedeo Pagani (three times). They have two children,  Gloria Samuela (1966) and Malcom (1975). They first married in London to please her father, then in the Abbey of Casamari in Ciociaria to please Pagani's mother as she did not know about the London event, and for a third and last time "in the house of Ananias grandfather, my father's father, with lots of dancing on the threshing floor." Pagani left Alberti in the 1980s for Elisabetta Billi but returned to her fifteen years later because of the children. They never officially divorced and Alberti refers to him as "then-husband, now a dear relative".
She does not believe in God, although she thinks there's a need of spirituality in the contemporary world.

Literary works
Riprendetevi la faccia, Mondadori (2010)
Il ritorno dei mariti, Mondadori (2006)
Il Principe Volante, Playground (2004)
Gelosa di Majakovskij,  (1994)
Il promesso sposo (a biography of Vittorio Sgarbi), Edoardo Sonzogno (1994)
Vocabolario d'amore, Rizzoli (1994)
La donna è un animale stravagante davvero, Frontiera Edizioni (1994)
Gianna Nannini da Siena (a biography of Gianna Nannini), Mondadori (1991)
Parliamo d'amore, Mondadori (1989)
Dispetti divini,  (1989)
Povera bambina, Mondadori (1987)
Tahiti Bill, Mondadori (1985)
Buonanotte Angelo, Mondadori (1985)
Scometto di sì, Mondadori (1984)
Fulmini, Spirali, (1984)
Il signore è servito, Mondadori (1983)
Sbrigati mama, Mondadori (1983)
Donna di piacere, Mondadori (1980)
Vangelo secondo Maria, Mondadori (1978)
Delirio, Mondadori (1977)
Memorie malvage,  (1976)

Filmography
 Misunderstood, directed by Asia Argento (2014)
 Io sono l'amore, directed by Luca Guadagnino (2009)
 Melissa P., directed by Luca Guadagnino (2005)
 Monella, directed by Tinto Brass (1998)
 Donna di piacere, directed by Paolo Quaregna (1997)
 Angeli a sud, directed by Massimo Scaglione (1992)
 Una donna allo specchio, directed by Paolo Quaregna (1984)
 La disubbidienza, directed by Aldo Lado (1981)
 Io sto con gli ippopotami, directed by Italo Zingarelli (1979)
 Ernesto, directed by Salvatore Samperi (1979)
 Mimì Bluette... fiore del mio giardino, directed by Carlo Di Palma (1977)
 Pensione paura, directed by Francesco Barilli (1977)
 Qui comincia l'avventura, directed by Carlo Di Palma (1975)
 Colpita da improvviso benessere, directed by Franco Giraldi (1975)
 Il portiere di notte, directed by Liliana Cavani (1974)
 Anche gli angeli mangiano fagioli directed by Enzo Barboni (1973)
 Più forte, ragazzi!, directed by Giuseppe Colizzi (1972)
 Il maestro e Margherita, directed by Aleksandar Petrović (1972)
 Una prostituta al servizio del pubblico e in regola con le leggi dello stato, directed by Italo Zingarelli (1970)
 So Long Gulliver, directed by Carlo Tuzii (1970)
 La stagione dei sensi, directed by Massimo Franciosa (1969)

Notes

External links
Page to be conductor of Radio24

1943 births
Living people
People from Umbertide
Italian women screenwriters
Italian women novelists
Italian women journalists
Italian women dramatists and playwrights
20th-century Italian dramatists and playwrights
21st-century Italian dramatists and playwrights
20th-century Italian screenwriters
21st-century Italian screenwriters